DXSP (96.1 FM), on-air as 96.1 One FM, is a radio station owned and operated by the Radio Corporation of the Philippines. The station's studio and transmitter are located at the 4/F Yuipco Bldg., Navarro St., Brgy. Taft, Surigao City.

On March 11, 2014, a fire in the building the station was located in damaged the station's equipment, its 2 transmitters and studio. Since then, One FM remained off-air until 2017, when it went back on air.

References

Radio stations in Surigao del Norte
Radio stations established in 2009